Basavakalyan Assembly constituency is one of the 224 assembly constituencies of Karnataka, a southern state of India. This constituency falls under Bidar Lok Sabha constituency.

Members of Legislative Assembly

Mysore State (Kalyani constituency)
 1957: Annapurna Bai, Indian National Congress
 1962: Annapurna Bai, Indian National Congress

Mysore State
 1967: S. Sanganbasappa, Independent
 1972: Bapurao Anand Rao, Indian National Congress

Karnataka State
 1978: Bapu Rao Hulsoorker, Indian National Congress (Indira)
 1983: Basawaraj Shankarappa Patil, Janata Party
 1985: Basavaraj Patil Attur, Janata Party
 1989: Basavaraj Patil Attur, Janata Dal
 1994: Basavaraj Patil Attur, Janata Dal
 1999: M. G. Mule, Janata Dal (Secular)
 2004: Mallikarjun Siddaramappa Khuba, Janata Dal (Secular)
 2008: Basavaraj Patil Attur, Bharatiya Janata Party
 2013: Mallikarjun Siddaramappa Khuba, Janata Dal (Secular)

Election results

2021 by election

2018

2013

See also
 Bidar (Lok Sabha constituency)
 Kalaburagi district

References

Assembly constituencies of Karnataka
Kalaburagi district